The Dr. Petar Beron Bulgarian Men's High School of Addrianople (Odrinska Balgarska Maszka Gimnaziya „Dr. Petar Beron“)  was the first Bulgarian high school in Eastern Thrace. One of the most influential Bulgarian educational centres in Thrace, it was founded in 1891 in Ottoman Adrianople and existed until 1913. Among the initiators, principals and teachers at the high school were noted Bulgarian intellectuals, scientists, and public figures of the Bulgarian revolutionary movement and politics of the early 20th century.

Famous alumni
Atanas Razboynikov

See also
 Bulgarian Men's High School of Thessaloniki
 Education in the Ottoman Empire

References

Source 
 

Defunct schools in Bulgaria
Defunct schools in Turkey
High schools in Edirne
Educational institutions established in 1891
Educational institutions disestablished in 1913
Ottoman Thrace
1891 establishments in the Ottoman Empire
Education in the Ottoman Empire